The 1970–71 FC Bayern Munich season was the club's sixth season in Bundesliga.

Team kit

Match results

Legend

Bundesliga

League fixtures and results

League standings

DFB-Pokal

Inter-Cities Fairs Cup

References

FC Bayern Munich seasons
Bayern